Ideford Common is a Site of Special Scientific Interest consisting of an area of lowland heath in Devon, England. The site is a habitat for nightjars and Dartford warblers, and is the site of several Bronze Age cairns and a barrow.

Ideford and Haldon Forest are nearby.

References 

Sites of Special Scientific Interest in Devon
Heathland Sites of Special Scientific Interest